The RP-23 Sapfir (NATO codename: High Lark) was a Soviet look-down/shoot-down radar system.  It was developed by Phazotron specifically for the Soviet Air Forces (VVS) new MiG-23 fighter aircraft and used in conjunction with the Vympel R-23 (NATO codename: AA-7 Apex) beyond visual range air-to-air missile.

Variants
Sapfir-23L
The initial production version, the Sapfir-23L (L - Lyogkiy or lightweight) pulse radar was first carried on the MiG-23 Edition 1971.  Using a twist-Cassegrain antenna  in diameter, it used a continuous-wave target illuminator channel to provide guidance for the semi-active radar homing (SARH) R-23R missile.  However as an interim variant it was considered unreliable and lacked the look-down/shoot-down capability of later Sapfir radars; it could only guide missiles onto targets flying above .
Sapfir-23D
Equipping the MiG-23M, the improved Sapfir-23D had look-down/shoot-down capability and could guide both R-23R and R-23T missiles.  It was not a true Doppler radar but used the less effective "envelope detection" technique common to Western radars of the 1960s.  The technology was reportedly taken from the F-4J AN/AWG-10 radars captured in Vietnam in 1967. The Sapfir-23D had a detection range of approximately 45km against a high-flying, fighter-sized target.  All Sapfir-23Ds were eventually updated to the definitive Sapfir-23D-III during field upgrades.
Sapfir-23D-III
The definitive version of the first-generation Sapfir-23s, all MiG-23Ms were fitted with the Sapfir-23D-III starting in 1975.  Working in the 3cm wavelength and with a carrier frequency of about 9 GHz, it had a detection range of about 45km against a high-altitude fighter-sized aircraft during a head-on engagement, and between 10 to 20km in look-down mode during a tail-chase engagement.  Against bomber-size targets these ranges were 55km and 15 to 20km respectively.  However in look-down/shoot-down mode targets flying slower than  would not be detected.
Sapfir-23E
A re-designation of the Sapfir-23D-III carried on the export-specific MiG-23MF.  Those which were sold to Third World clients had downgraded performance and lacked electronic counter-countermeasures (ECCM).
Sapfir-23ML (N003)
Equipping the newer MiG-23ML, the Sapfir-23ML was an improvement upon the Sapfir-23D-III, being more reliable and with superior look-down/shoot-down capability.  It had a maximum detection range of 65km against a fighter-sized target at high altitude, reduced to 25km in look-down mode.
Sapfir-23MLA (N003)
An improved version of the Sapfir-23ML with better range, reliability, ECCM and the capability to guide the updated R-24R/T air-to-air missiles.  It also had a frequency spacing feature that prevented multiple radars from interfering with each other's operation, allowing for group-search patterns to be conducted.
Sapfir-23MLAE (N003E)
A downgraded version of the N003 carried on MiG-23MLDs exported to Syria.  It was also carried on export versions of the MiG-23ML.  The N003E had no ability to detect or track targets in a tail-chase engagement, relying on the fighter's IRST instead.  It's field of scan was +/- 30° to either side of the fighter's nose and +/- 6° in elevation.
Sapfir-23MLA-II (N008)
The ultimate version of the RP-23, the N008 was carried on the MiG-23MLD used by the VVS.  Weighing , it had an average emitting power of 1 KW and peak output of 60 kW.  It featured improved detection range, reliability, ECCM, look-down/shoot-down over rough terrain, and a close air combat mode with vertical-scan capability.  Search range against high-altitude targets was 75km for a bomber-sized target and 52km for a fighter-sized target; in look-down mode it was 23km for both target types, except for fighter-sized targets in a head-on engagements in which case it was 14km. Tracking range against high-altitude targets was 52km for bomber-sized and 39km for fighter-sized targets; in look-down mode it was 23km for bombers, while for fighter-sized targets it was 15km in tail-chase or 9km in head-on engagements.  The scan field was limited to 60° x 6°, although it could be steered up to 60° left and right to expand the search area.
Sapfir-23P (N006)
This derivative of the Sapfir-23ML was designed specifically for the MiG-23P interceptor, although initial models were unreliable and required additional maintenance.  It had slightly improved look-down/shoot-down, including against cruise missiles.

References

Bibliography
 

Aircraft radars
Russian and Soviet military radars
Phazotron products